The water buffalo (Bubalus bubalis) is a domesticated bovid widely kept in Asia, Europe and South America.

Water buffalo can also refer to:
Wild water buffalo (Bubalus arnee), the wild ancestor of the domestic water buffalo
 Various other smaller species in the genus Bubalus
Water buffalo (zodiac), a Vietnamese zodiac sign
Water buffalo incident, a racial controversy at the University of Pennsylvania in 1993 
LVT-2 Water Buffalo, a US Second World War military vehicle used to transport troops and supplies from ship to shore
 A nickname for the Suzuki GT750 motorcycle
 A World War II US water tank mounted on a 2-wheeled trailer, catalog number G-527
The Loyal Order of Water Buffaloes, a secret society that exists on the Flintstones

Animal common name disambiguation pages